Jeong (the Revised Romanization spelling of ) may refer to:
Jeong (surname)
Jung (Korean given name)
Qing (concept), concept from Neo-Confucian philosophy